Inío is a village on Chiloé Island in Chile. It is the southernmost and most remote populated place on the island. Until 2013, it was accessible only by a six-hour motorboat ride from Quellon, Chile. In 2013, an airstrip was constructed allowing for short local flights, cutting access time to Quellon to 18 minutes. The village is located next to the Rio Inío.

References 

Populated places in Chiloé